The 1987 Dunlop RAC British Touring Car Championship was the 30th season of the championship. The series, previously the British Saloon Car Championship, had a new name and new sponsor. Chris Hodgetts successfully defended his drivers title with his class D Toyota Corolla.

Teams & Drivers